William "Wild Bill" Cantrell (born in West Point, Kentucky, January 31, 1908 - died January 22, 1996) was a power boat and IndyCar driver.

In 1949, Cantrell won the prestigious hydroplane Gold Cup in Detroit. He was inducted in the Motorsports Hall of Fame of America in 1992 in the power boats category.

Indy 500 results

* shared drive with Bayliss Levrett

Complete Formula One World Championship results
(key) 
 
 * Indicates shared drive with Bayliss Levrett.

References

1908 births
1996 deaths
American motorboat racers
APBA Challenge Cup
H1 Unlimited
Hydroplanes
Indianapolis 500 drivers
People from Hardin County, Kentucky
Racing drivers from Kentucky
Racing motorboats